The Egbema tribe also called Egbema Kingdom, of the Ijaw people live in the Delta and Edo States. The Kingdom is split politically into two different states due to the creation of Nigerian states.

The Egbema have a strong Ijaw cultural identity, despite their location on the western fringe of Ijawland. The Kingdom traces its origins to several migrations from the Ijaw heartland centuries ago.
Egbema tribe is under the overlordship of the Agadagba of Egbema Kingdom.
The Kingdom is made up of nine original settlements (clans) called the Egbema-Isenabiri. These are:
 Ofiniama
 Ajakurama
 Opuama
 Ogbudugbudu
 Gbeoba
 Abere
 Abadigbene (Bolou-Jamagie)
 Jamagie, and
 Ogbinbiri

References 

Igbo
Indigenous peoples of Rivers State